John G. Tucker (born September 29, 1964) is a Canadian former professional ice hockey centre who played twelve seasons in the National Hockey League in the 1980s and 1990s, most notably with the Buffalo Sabres and the Tampa Bay Lightning, scoring 177 goals and 259 assists in 656 career regular season games and a further 28 points in 31 play-off games.  He played several more seasons in Italy and Japan as well.

Playing career 
Tucker was drafted 31st overall by Buffalo in the 1983 NHL Entry Draft having played junior for the Kitchener Rangers where he won the Memorial Cup in 1982.  He played for Buffalo from 1983 through 1989. He was acquired by the Washington Capitals on January 5, 1990.
  Rejoining the Sabres the following season, following an off season trade from Washington, he was again traded, this time to the New York Islanders.  The following season, Tucker joined H.C. Asiago of the Italian League, scoring 88 points in 36 games and winning the Trofeo Gazzetino for MVP of the league .  Tucker returned to the NHL in 1992, when he joined expansion franchise Tampa Bay, playing four seasons with the Lightning.

In 1996–97 season, Tucker returned to Italy, playing for HC Milano.  The following three seasons John played in Japan for Kokudo Keikaku.

Coaching career
Since 2006, Tucker has served as an advisor and interim coach for his former Italian team H.C. Asiago. In 2010, Tucker was named head coach and led the team to two consecutive league championships and a Continental Cup final. Tucker recently completed his third season coaching H.C. Asiago.

On April 17, 2014, Tucker was named head coach of the Buffalo Junior Sabres Junior A team of the Ontario Junior Hockey League.

Personal life 
Tucker resides in Tampa, Florida, and Asiago, Italy. He is the founder of the Tampa Bay Lightning Alumni Association chapter, and is heavily involved in Florida youth hockey.

Career statistics

Regular season and playoffs

References

External links

Junior Lightning Is Rsunner-Up In Nike Bauer International Tournament online Center ice online article

1964 births
Buffalo Sabres draft picks
Buffalo Sabres players
Canadian ice hockey centres
Canadian sportspeople of Japanese descent
Asiago Hockey 1935 players
HC Milano players
Ice hockey people from Ontario
Sportspeople from Windsor, Ontario
Kitchener Rangers players
Kokudo Keikaku players
Living people
New York Islanders players
Tampa Bay Lightning players
Washington Capitals players
Canadian expatriate ice hockey players in Italy